Chiara Arcangeli (born 14 February 1983) is a retired Italian female volleyball player.

She was part of the Italy women's national volleyball team at the 2010 FIVB Volleyball Women's World Championship in Japan. She played with Pallavolo Sirio Perugia.

Clubs
  Pallavolo Sirio Perugia (2010)

References

External links
 

1983 births
Living people
Italian women's volleyball players
21st-century Italian women